Souths Rugby Club or Souths  is an Australian rugby union club based in Brisbane, and the Southern districts area that currently plays in the Queensland Premier Rugby club competition. The club was established in 1948, and since then has produced a host of Queensland and Wallaby rugby players.

Queensland Premier Rugby results

Queensland Premier Rugby

Premiers, Hospital Cup Premierships (Hospital Cup)

Queensland Premier Rugby

Runners-up, (Vince Nicholls Memorial Trophy)

Australian Club Championship results

Australian Club Championship

Premiers, Club Championship years

Australian Club Championship

Runners-up, Club Championship years

Honours
Queensland Premier Rugby – Premiers: (10) 1958, 1986, 1991, 1992, 1993, 1994, 1995, 1998, 2000, 2015
Queensland Premier Rugby – Runners-up: (10) 1955, 1957, 1962, 1980, 1987, 1988, 1989, 1996, 1997, 2009  
Australian Club Championship – Premiers: (1) 1987
Australian Club Championship – Runners-up: (2) 1991, 2016

Internationals

 Samu Kerevi
 Lukhan Tui

See also

 Queensland Premier Rugby
 Rugby union in Queensland
 Brisbane Junior Rugby union

External links
Souths Rugby – Official website

Rugby union teams in Queensland
Sporting clubs in Brisbane
1948 establishments in Australia
Rugby clubs established in 1948